Lutheran High School La Verne (also known as Faith Lutheran), is a private, college preparatory Lutheran High School in La Verne, California. In the century-long tradition of the Lutheran Church–Missouri Synod, Lutheran High School La Verne serves students from the San Gabriel, Pomona, and Inland Valleys. Built on a foundation of faith in Christ, the school provides rigorous, college preparatory curriculum to a co-educational student population in grades nine through twelve. It is part of the Lutheran Church–Missouri Synod. The school colors are red, white and blue and the mascot is the Trojans.

One special feature of the program at Lutheran High School is its Naval Junior Reserve Officer Training Corps program, which enrolls over 20% of the student population annually. It is one of only five NJROTC units in the United States that are available in a private school. Because of the achievements of the NJROTC Unit at Lutheran High School, the U.S. Navy rates LHS as an honor distinguished unit. NJROTC Scholarships are available for college-bound students.

Accreditation
Lutheran High School is fully accredited by the Western Association of Schools and Colleges (WASC) through 2019. College-preparatory classes offered are approved by the University of California System.

Athletics
Lutheran High School is a member of CIF and competes as an Independent school. Lutheran High School offers the following athletic teams: Football, girls' volleyball, girls' and boys' basketball, soccer, wrestling, baseball, softball, girls' and boys' track and field, golf and cheer.

Notable alumni
Grant Jerrett, NBA basketball player and McDonald's All-American.

External links
Lutheran High Website

High schools in Los Angeles County, California
La Verne, California
Secondary schools affiliated with the Lutheran Church–Missouri Synod
Private high schools in California
1973 establishments in California
Educational institutions established in 1973
Lutheran schools in California